Jason Byrne (born 25 February 1972) is an Irish stand-up comedian.

In August 2008, he made his twelfth Edinburgh Festival Fringe appearance. Byrne previously presented a mid-morning radio show on Phantom FM as well as a comedy chat show The Jason Byrne Show featuring P. J. Gallagher, and a comedy panel show called The Byrne Ultimatum on RTÉ Two. He created and starred in a radio show also called The Jason Byrne Show from 2010 to 2012 on BBC Radio 2. The second series was awarded a Gold Sony Radio Award for Best Comedy.

In 2018, he published The Accidental Adventures of Onion O'Brien, a series of books about a young boy growing up in Ireland who has constant bad luck. The book is based on Byrne's childhood.

Personal life
Byrne was born in Dublin, in the suburb of Ballinteer. Byrne was married to Brenda from 2004 until 2018 and has 2 children.

Awards and nominations
 Finalist in So You Think You're Funny in 1996
 Nominated for the Perrier Best Newcomer Award in 1998
 Nominated for the Perrier Award in 2001 for his show entitled "Jason Byrne".
 Forth One Fringe Award in 2004 at the Edinburgh Festival Fringe

Stand-up shows
 2001 – Jason Byrne (Perrier Nominee)
 2003 – Jason Byrne Hates...
 2003 – Jason Byrne
 2004 – Jason Byrne: That’s Not a Badger
 2005 – The Lovely Goat Show
 2006 – Sheep for Feet and Rams for Hands
 2007 – Afterhours
 2008 – Cats Under Mats, Having Chats with Bats
 2009 – The Byrne Supremacy
 2010 – Jason Byrne 2010
 2011 – Cirque Du Byrne
 2021 - Edinburgh fringe where he was joined by Antonio Falzarano on stage.

Filmography

Television
 35 Aside (Football Hooligan) (1996)
 Father Ted (Referee) (1998)
 Comedy Lab (Jason Byrne Is Twiggy No Branch) (1999)
 Dark Ages (Arland) (1999)
 The Jason Byrne Show (2002)
 Separation Anxiety (Waiter) (2002)
 Paddy Muck (2005)
 Emily's Song (Robert) (2006)
 Comedy Cuts (2007)
 Anonymous (2007–2010)
 Dick & Dom's Funny Business (Special Guest) (2011)
 The Comedy Annual (2011)
 Melbourne Comedy Festival Great Debate 2011 (2011)
 Live at the Apollo (Series 7, Episode 1) (2011)
 The Matt Lucas Awards (2013)
 Father Figure (2013)
 Alan Davies: As Yet Untitled'" (Series 1, Episode 2) (2014)
 Wild Things (Presenter) (2015)
 Don't Say It... Bring It! (Host) (2017)
 Ireland's Got Talent (Judge) (2018–2019)
 Show Me the Movie! (2018)
 Hughesy, We Have a Problem (2018)

Film
 I Went Down (Cork Man No. 2) (1997)
 The General (Reporter 2) (1998)
 Alice in Wonderland (Pat the Gardener) (1999)
 Killing Bono (Hotel Receptionist) (2011)

Radio
 The Jason Byrne Show (2010–2012)

Stand-up DVDs
 Out of the Box (20 November 2006)
 Live – Cirque Du Byrne'' (19 November 2012)

References

External links
 Jason Byrne Official Site
 
 Jason Byrne at Edinburgh Comedy Festival
 Review of Jason Byrne's: The Byrne Supremacy at Edinburgh Festival Fringe 2009

1972 births
Living people
Irish male comedians
Irish stand-up comedians
Comedians from Dublin (city)
People from Swords, Dublin